Asphodelus fistulosus is a species of plant known as hollow-stemmed asphodel, onionweed, onion-leafed asphodel, and pink asphodel. It is native to the Mediterranean region. It is an invasive exotic weed in the United States, with significant infestations in California, Arizona, New Mexico, and Texas. It is listed as a Federal Noxious Weed by the United States Department of Agriculture. It is also a common weed in parts of Australia, New Zealand, and Mexico, and it thrives in any area with a Mediterranean climate.

It is an annual or short-lived perennial herb growing a hollow stem up to 70 centimeters tall. The root system has a series of tuber-like parts at the base of the stem. The plant takes the form of a large tuft of onion-like rounded hollow leaves up to 30 centimeters long. The inflorescence is a panicle with widely spaced flowers. Each flower is 5 to 12 millimeters wide with six tepals which are generally white or very pale pink with a neat central longitudinal stripe of brown to reddish-purple. The flowers are diurnal, closing at night and in overcast or low-light weather conditions. The fruit is a rounded capsule containing six seeds.

References

External links
  Comprehensive profile for Asphodelus fistulosus from the website MaltaWildPlants.com
Flora of North America Profile
Jepson Manual Treatment
Photo gallery

Asphodeloideae
Plants described in 1753
Taxa named by Carl Linnaeus
Flora of Malta